Megachile staudingeri is a species of bee in the family Megachilidae. It was described by Friese in 1905.

References

Staudingeri
Insects described in 1905